Serhiy Serhiyovych Yakovenko (born 10 May 1975) is a Ukrainian football coach and a former player.

Honours
Rīga
Latvian Higher League bronze: 2007

References

External links

1975 births
Living people
Footballers from Kharkiv
Soviet footballers
Ukrainian footballers
Association football midfielders
Ukrainian expatriate footballers
Expatriate footballers in Russia
Expatriate footballers in Belarus
Expatriate footballers in Kazakhstan
Expatriate footballers in Latvia
Ukrainian expatriate sportspeople in Russia
Ukrainian expatriate sportspeople in Belarus
Ukrainian expatriate sportspeople in Kazakhstan
Ukrainian expatriate sportspeople in Latvia
Russian Premier League players
Ukrainian Premier League players
FC Metalist Kharkiv players
FC Olympik Kharkiv players
FC Zhemchuzhina Sochi players
FC Arsenal Tula players
FC Amkar Perm players
FC Fakel Voronezh players
FC Kristall Smolensk players
FC Rubin Kazan players
FC Baltika Kaliningrad players
FC Arsenal Kharkiv players
FC Partizan Minsk players
FK Rīga players
FC Komunalnyk Luhansk players
FC Zirka Kropyvnytskyi players
Ukrainian football managers
FC Neftekhimik Nizhnekamsk players